Empire Cloud was a  cargo ship which was built in 1940 by William Pickersgill & Sons Ltd, Sunderland for the Ministry of War Transport (MoWT). She was torpedoed on her maiden voyage, but repaired and returned to service. In 1942, she was torpedoed and sank whilst under tow to port.

Description
The ship was built by William Pickersgill & Sons Ltd, Sunderland. She was launched on 27 December 1940 and completed in April 1941.

She had a GRT of 5,669 and a NRT of 3,546.

The engine was built by George Clarke (1938) Ltd, Sunderland.

History
Empire Cloud was built for the MoWT. She was placed under the management of Allen, Black & Co Ltd. Her port of registry was Sunderland. The Code Letters BCGC and United Kingdom Official Number 168668 were allocated.

Empire Cloud was a member of a number of convoys during the Second World War.

OB 318
Convoy OB 318 departed from Liverpool on 2 May 1941 and dispersed at sea on 10 May. Empire Cloud was on her maiden voyage. At 14:28 on 9 May, Empire Cloud was torpedoed and damaged by  when east northeast of Cape Farewell. The ship was abandoned, but  assisted in the protection of her while the Dutch tug Thames was despatched from Reykjavík, Iceland.  also assisted Empire Cloud. She was repaired and returned to service.

HX 167
Empire Cloud may have sailed in Convoy HX 167, which departed Halifax, Nova Scotia on 27 December 1941 and arrived at Liverpool on 11 January 1942. She is noted under Convoy SC 63 as having come from HX 167.

SC 63
Convoy SC 63 departed from Sydney, Cape Breton on 3 January 1942 and dispersed at sea on 13 January. Empire Cloud was carrying a general cargo and was bound for Manchester.

TAW(S)
Empire Cloud was a member of Convoy TAW(S). The surviving crew were rescued by other ships in the convoy. They were landed at Key West, Florida and Mobile, Alabama. Those lost on Empire Cloud are commemorated at the Tower Hill Memorial, London.

References

1940 ships
Ships built on the River Wear
Empire ships
Ministry of War Transport ships
Steamships of the United Kingdom
Maritime incidents in May 1941
Maritime incidents in August 1942
Ships sunk by German submarines in World War II
World War II shipwrecks in the Caribbean Sea